Oxygène 7–13 (known as "Oxygène 2" on the Oxygène Trilogy box set) is the twelfth studio album by French electronic musician and composer Jean-Michel Jarre, released by Disques Dreyfus on February 1997. It is the sequel to his 1976 album Oxygène released previously two decades, used the same synthesizers and is dedicated to Jarre's former mentor, experimental musician Pierre Schaeffer. The album cover art was created by long-time collaborator Michel Granger.

Background 
Oxygène 7-13 is dedicated to his mentor at the GRM, Pierre Schaeffer, who had died two years before. The album was recorded and mixed by Jarre together with Patrick Pelamourges and René Ameline respectively at Oxygene studio and Croissy studio. It was also the last album by Jarre featuring Michel Geiss as collaborator. It also had the collaboration of the keyboardist Francis Rimbert and the programmer Christian Sales. He combined the "spherical sounds" of the 1976 album with contemporary rhythms. Eschewing digital techniques developed in the 1980s, in an interview for The Daily Telegraph he said:

Release 
Oxygène 7-13 was released in February 1997. "Oxygène 7", "Oxygène 8" and "Oxygène 10" were released as singles. A number of remixes of Oxygène 7–13 tracks were made, including those comprising most of the album Odyssey Through O2. The Orb's "Toxygene" was originally going to be a remix of "Oxygène 8". However, The Orb "obliterated it" and reassembled only a few fragments for their new song. The album was followed by a promotional indoor European tour, and a concert in Moscow, Russia in which he would break for the fourth and last time his record for the largest audience in an open-air concert with a total of 3.5 million.

Track listing 
All tracks by Jean-Michel Jarre.

Equipment 
Adapted from liner notes of the album:
ARP 2600
EMS VCS 3
EMS Synthi AKS
Eminent 310 Unique
Mellotron M400
Theremin
Yamaha CS-80
Quasimidi Raven
Digisequencer
Akai MPC 3000
Nordlead
JV 90
K2000
RMI Harmonic Synthesizer
Korg Prophecy
Roland TR-808
Roland DJ-70

Charts

Weekly charts

Year-end charts

Certifications and sales

References

Further reading

External links 
 Oxygène 7–13 at Discogs

1997 albums
Jean-Michel Jarre albums
Sequel albums